The hypodermic needle model (known as the hypodermic-syringe model, transmission-belt model, or magic bullet theory) is a model of communication suggesting that an intended message is directly received and wholly accepted by the receiver. The model was originally rooted in 1930s behaviourism and largely considered obsolete for a long time, but big data analytics-based mass customisation has led to a modern revival of the basic idea.

Concept
The "Magic Bullet" or "Hypodermic Needle Theory" of direct influence effects was based on early observations of the effect of mass media, as used by Nazi propaganda and the effects of Hollywood in the 1930s and 1940s. People were assumed to be "uniformly controlled by their biologically based 'instincts' and that they react more or less uniformly to whatever 'stimuli' came along". The "Magic Bullet" theory graphically assumes that the media's message is a bullet fired from the "media gun" into the viewer's "head". Similarly, the "Hypodermic Needle Model" uses the same idea of the "shooting" paradigm. It suggests that the media injects its messages straight into the passive audience. This passive audience is immediately affected by these messages. The public essentially cannot escape from the media's influence, and is therefore considered a "sitting duck". Both models suggest that the public is vulnerable to the messages shot at them because of the limited communication tools and the studies of the media's effects on the masses at the time. It means the media explores information in such a way that it injects in the mind of audiences as bullets.

Though the "magic bullet" and "hypodermic needle" models are often credited to Harold Lasswell's 1927 book, Propaganda Technique in the World War, neither term appear in his writing. Rather, Lasswell argued that the rise of political movements across Europe was "an almost inevitable outcomes of the isolation of the individual in an atomized society." Recent work in the history of communication studies have  documented how the two models may have served as strawman theory or fallacy or even a "myth". Others have documented the possible medical origins of the metaphor of the magic bullet model.

Two-step flow

The phrasing "hypodermic needle" is meant to give a mental image of the direct, strategic, and planned infusion of a message into an individual. But as research methodology became more highly developed, it became apparent that the media had selective influences on people.

The most famous incident often cited as an example for the hypodermic needle model was the 1938 broadcast of The War of the Worlds and the subsequent reaction of widespread panic among its American mass audience. However, this incident actually sparked the research movement, led by Paul Lazarsfeld and Herta Herzog, that would disprove the magic bullet or hypodermic needle theory, as Hadley Cantril managed to show that reactions to the broadcast were, in fact, diverse, and were largely determined by situational and attitudinal attributes of the listeners.

In the 1940s, Lazarsfeld disproved the "magic bullet" theory and "hypodermic needle model theory" through elections studies in "The People's Choice". Lazarsfeld and colleagues executed the study by gathering research during the election of Franklin D. Roosevelt in 1940. The study was conducted to determine voting patterns and the relationship between the media and political power. Lazarsfeld discovered that the majority of the public remained unfazed by propaganda surrounding Roosevelt's campaign. Instead, interpersonal outlets proved more influential than the media. Therefore, Lazarsfeld concluded that the effects of the campaign were not all powerful to the point where they completely persuaded "helpless audiences", a claim that the Magic Bullet, Hypodermic Needle Model, and Lasswell asserted. These new findings also suggested that the public can select which messages affect and don't affect them.

Lazarsfeld's debunking of these models of communication provided the way for new ideas regarding the media's effects on the public. Lazarsfeld introduced the idea of the two-step flow of communication in 1944. Elihu Katz contributed to the model in 1955 through studies and publications. The model of the two-step flow of communication assumes that ideas flow from the mass media to opinion leaders and then to the greater public. They believed the message of the media to be transferred to the masses via this opinion leadership. Opinion leaders are categorized as individuals with the best understanding of media content and the most accessibility to the media as well. These leaders essentially take in the media's information, and explain and spread the media's messages to others.

Disagreements about the hypodermic needle theory may be based on how audiences are classified. For example, the pro-hypodermic perspective suggests that despite differing types of audiences, the theory remains valid if a direct effect occurs. However, many anti-hypodermic views instead note that the theory can only be applied if the effect works on a similar, mass group of people. Other interpretation differences depend on whether researchers involve mediating and intervening variables in case studies. This may include the influence of an audience’s prior knowledge and background.

Thus, the two step flow model and other communication theories suggest that the media does not directly have an influence on viewers anymore. Instead, interpersonal connections and even selective exposure play a larger role in influencing the public in the modern age. Contemporary research suggests that individuals are more likely to form opinions through the two step flow process, and through the role of influencers and opinion leaders on social media outlets. Social media has become an increasingly individualized experience and process, thus users are likely to form opinions based on the content they are exposed to and interact with.

Contemporary one-step flow
More recently, the use of big data analytics to identify user preferences and to send tailor-made messages to individuals led back to the idea of a "one-step flow of communication", which is in principle similar to the hypodermic needle model. The difference is that today's massive databases allow for the mass customization of messages. So it is not one generic mass media message, but many individualized messages, coordinated by a massive algorithm. For example, empirical studies have found that in Twitter networks, traditional mass media outlets receive 80–90% of their Twitter mentions directly through a direct one-step flow from average Twitter users. However, these same studies also argue that there is a multitude of step-flow models at work in today's digital communication landscape.

Theory application in the digital age
Although the hypodermic needle theory was studied more in depth in the early half of the 20th century, the integration of social media platforms further tests the theory’s application. The invention of the internet and popularity of social media channels makes social interaction a two-way street. Through this, influencers, leaders, politicians, brands and individuals can communicate with one another. This social relationship has led to behavior changes in the digital age, some of which align with characteristics of the hypodermic needle theory.

As a digital case example, current research examines how false news reached mass audiences in Nigeria on October 11, 2017. Rumors spread through the South Eastern states of Nigeria that soldiers were supposedly vaccinating and infecting children with the Monkeypox disease. This became a headline in newspapers and social media sites, such as WhatsApp, and aided in creating mass panic and fear. Parents reacted by messaging each other, sharing online posts and rushing to schools to pick up their children.  Research gathered from this case suggests that although the parents and citizens were active in responding and communicating through social channels, they were passive in their choice to believe the false narrative.

The hypodermic needle theory is based purely on assumptions about human behaviors. But, contemporary research adds that these behaviors and methods are always evolving and changing. In the field of science and information technology, researchers suggest using social media literacy as a tool for combating passive media consumption. They suggest increasing critical thinking use, and questioning the validity and credibility of what is on social media platforms. Similarly, contemporary research considers libraries and information centers as a form of media because of their influence over knowledge and source selection.

See also
Agenda-setting theory
Media effects theory
Meme

References

Notes

Sources

Berger, A. A. (1995). Essentials of Mass Communication Theory. London: SAGE Publications.
Croteau, D. & Hoynes, W. (1997). "Industries and Audience". Media/Society. London: Pine Forge Press.
Davis, D.K. & Baron, S.J. (1981). "A History of Our Understanding of Mass Communication". In: Davis, D.K. & Baron and S.J. (Eds.). Mass Communication and Everyday Life: A Perspective on Theory and Effects (19-52). Belmont: Wadsworth Publishing.
Katz, E., Lazarsfeld, P.F. (1955). Personal Influence: the Part Played by People in the Flow of Mass Communication's. 309.

Lubken, D. (2008). Remembering the Straw Man: The Travels and Adventures of Hypodermic. In D. W. Park & J. Pooley (Eds.), The history of media and communication research: contested memories: Peter Lang Publishing.
Severin, W. J. and Tankard, J.W. (1979). Communication Theories -- Origins, Methods and Uses. New York: Hastings House. 
Sproule, J. M. (1989). Progressive Propaganda Critics and the Magic Bullet Myth. Critical Studies in Mass Communication, 6(3), 225-246. doi:citeulike-article-id:9472331
Thibault, G. (2016). Needles and Bullets: Media Theory, Medicine, and Propaganda, 1910-1940. In K. Nixon & L. Servitje (Eds.), Endemic: Essays in Contagion Theory (pp. 67–91). Basingstoke: Palgrave Macmillan.

Influence of mass media
Mass media theories
Politics
Sociological theories